Down is an original novel by Lawrence Miles  featuring the fictional archaeologist Bernice Summerfield. The New Adventures were a spin-off from the long-running British science fiction television series Doctor Who.

As with some other Bernice Summerfield fiction, the novel is written as if taken from Bernice's diaries and, as such, explores the implications of her being an unreliable narrator. The novel includes characters from the People, an alien civilisation introduced in The Also People.

External links
Lawrence Miles' Glossary and Appendices for Down

1997 British novels
1997 science fiction novels
Virgin New Adventures
Novels by Lawrence Miles
Fictional diaries
Fiction with unreliable narrators